

The Ball-Bartoe JW-1 Jetwing was a US research aircraft flown in the 1970s to investigate blown wing technology.

Design and development
The Jetwing was a small, mid-wing design powered by a turbofan and fitted with tail-wheel undercarriage. The upper surface of the swept wings incorporated a slot along 70% span, through which air from the engine's fan stage could be discharged. Mounted above this slot was a small secondary airfoil called an "augmentor", intended to direct the discharged airflow over the wing.

Following the test program, the aircraft was donated to the University of Tennessee Space Institute in Tullahoma, which donated the Jetwing to the Wings Over the Rockies Air and Space Museum in Denver, Colorado in 2007.

Specifications (Jetwing)

References

 
 
 

Ball-Bartoe aircraft
1970s United States experimental aircraft
Single-engined jet aircraft
Mid-wing aircraft
Aircraft first flown in 1977
Conventional landing gear